Nepomuceno is a Brazilian municipality located in the south of the state of Minas Gerais.

The city belongs to the IBGE statistical microregion of Varginha. Distances to major and nearby cities are:
Belo Horizonte – 233 km
São Paulo – 330 km
Rio de Janeiro – 396 km
Brasília – 1085 km
Três Pontas – 54 km
Três Corações – 80 km
Varginha – 81 km
Lavras – 25 km
The climate is humid, with mild summers, subject to sporadic periods of drought and with mild winters. The annual rainfall is 1,600 mm.

Temperature 
Annual average: 21.2 C
Annual average maximum: 27.8 C
Annual average minimum: 13.5 C

The main source of income is the cultivation of coffee, which represents 70% of the economy. There is also production of corn, rice, and beans.
Another important activity is poultry raising, producing around one million eggs a day. In 2006 there were 1,080 rural producers with an area of 34,213 hectares of agricultural land. Cultivated land made up 16,000 hectares. There were 4,800 workers in agriculture.

In the health sector there were 12 health clinics and 1 private hospital, with 47 beds (2005). In the school system there were 31 primary schools, of which 3 were private, and 2 middle schools, of which 1 was private. In 2005 there were 114 attending an extension of a private university.

Municipal Human Development Index 
, the municipal Human Development Index for Nepomuceno was .747.
State ranking: 309 out of 853 municipalities
National ranking: 1,965 out of 5,138 municipalities
Life expectancy: 71
Literacy rate: 85

See also
 List of municipalities in Minas Gerais

References

City government
IBGE

Municipalities in Minas Gerais